José Natividad Macías Castorena (1857–1948) was a Mexican lawyer.

National Autonomous University of Mexico alumni
Academic staff of the National Autonomous University of Mexico
19th-century Mexican lawyers
1857 births
1948 deaths
People from Guanajuato
20th-century Mexican lawyers